Heinz Hellmich (9 June 1890 – 17 June 1944) was a German general (Generalleutnant) in the Wehrmacht during World War II and a posthumous recipient of the Knight's Cross of the Iron Cross of Nazi Germany.

On 1 April 1942, Hellmich was appointed commander of the 141st Reserve Division. In 1943, he worked with a Soviet defector, Red Army general Andrey Vlasov, and other volunteers from the Soviet Union as "General of the Eastern Troops" (General der Osttruppen), a position he held until early January 1944.

On 10 January 1944, Hellmich was moved to France and put in a command of the 243rd Infantry Division, a coastal defense division stationed in the Cotentin Peninsula. The division protected the western coast of the Cotentin Peninsula when Operation Overlord, the Allied invasion of Normandy, began on 6 June 1944. Hellmich was killed by 20-millimeter cannon shells during an Allied air attack on 17 June 1944.

Awards

 Knight's Cross of the Iron Cross on 2 September 1944 as Generalleutnant and commander of 243. Infanterie-Division

References

Citations

Bibliography

1890 births
1944 deaths
German Army personnel killed in World War II
German Army personnel of World War I
Lieutenant generals of the German Army (Wehrmacht)
People from the Grand Duchy of Baden
Military personnel from Karlsruhe
Prussian Army personnel
Recipients of the clasp to the Iron Cross, 1st class
Recipients of the Knight's Cross of the Iron Cross
Deaths by airstrike during World War II
German Army generals of World War II